Fritschiella is a genus of green algae in the family Fritschiellaceae. There are two species F. tuberosa and a new freshwater species from China, F. aquatilis 

The genus name of Fritschiella is in honour of Felix Eugen Fritsch (1879–1954), who was a British biologist.

The genus was circumscribed by Mandeyam Osuri and Parthasarathy Iyengar in New Phytol. Vol.31 on page 335 in 1932.

Accepted species 
 Fritschiella tuberosa M.O.P.Iyengar
 Fritschiella aquatilis H.Su, J.Feng, J.Lv, Q.Liu, F.Nan & S.Xie, 2019

References

External links

Chaetophorales genera
Chaetophoraceae